The Royal Thai Armed Forces Headquarters ( or the RTARF HQ, is the "mostly ornamental" joint headquarters of the Royal Thai Armed Forces, which is composed of the Royal Thai Army, the Royal Thai Navy and Royal Thai Marine Corps, and the Royal Thai Air Force. Formerly the Supreme Command Headquarters (the name was changed in February 2008. The headquarters is divided into two branches: the "Command Group" and the  "Joint Group". The headquarters is headed by the Chief of Defence Forces (currently General Chalermpol Srisawat of the Royal Thai Army. The chief is supported by several departments and directorates, including four deputy chiefs. The headquarters is under the responsibility of the Ministry of Defence of Thailand and the Defence Minister.

Function
The headquarters is the supreme command of the armed forces and therefore at the apex of the military in Thailand. The headquarters is charged with the command and execution of military operations in wartime. In peacetime, it is charged with maintaining military readiness in case of attack. The headquarters is also in charge of the security of the royal family and the king. In addition to the command of  the armed forces during times of war, the headquarters also commands Thai forces overseas in peacekeeping and humanitarian assistance operations.

History

Temporary command
The Supreme Command Headquarters of the Royal Thai Armed Forces was originally a temporary position that had only been called into existence twice: once, during the Franco–Thai War in 1940 and again during the Greater East Asia War (Second World War: Pacific Theatre). During both of these conflicts, the headquarters was commanded by Field Marshal Plaek Pibulsonggram, the prime minister of Thailand and creator of the supreme command system. Temporary personnel were called from their existing units and released after conflict subsided in 1945.

Permanent command
On 27 September 1957, King Bhumibol Adulyadej as Commander-in-Chief and Head of the Royal Thai Armed Forces (appointed Field Marshal Sarit Thanarat to the position of Supreme Commander. The Defence Staff Department was also created to serve as the commander's administrative office. Field Marshal Sarit became Prime Minister in 1959 and subsequently relinquished command of the Supreme Command Headquarters on his deathbed in 1963. He was succeeded by Thanom Kittikachorn.

During the 1960s, the government saw the establishment of the permanent Supreme Command Headquarters as a necessity for the preparation of military forces and national defence. On 16 March 1960, the passage of the "Organization of Ministry of Defence Act of 1960" upgraded the Defence Staff Department to Supreme Command Headquarters. This action originally created four groups of agencies within the Supreme Command Headquarters: Staff, Special Services, Combat Support, and Education. The Supreme Command Headquarters is currently organized into five groups: the Command Group, the Joint Staff Group, the Operations Group, the Special Services Group, and the Education Group.

The Supreme Command Headquarters also has operational control of the Border Patrol Police.

Reform
On 2 February 2008, the "Supreme Command Headquarters" became the "Royal Thai Armed Forces Headquarters" under the "Organization of Ministry of Defence Act, 2008". The position of Supreme Commander became the Chief of Defence Forces.

Departments
The RTARF HQ is composed of five groups:

Command Group
Office of the Headquarters
Office of the Secretary
Office of Inspector General
Office of Internal Audit
Office of Judge Advocate General
Office of Welfare
Office of Inspector General
Office of Post Engineer
Royal Development Projects and Security Coordination Center
Thailand Mine Action Center 
Royal Thai Armed Forces Cyber Center

Joint Staff Group
Directorate of Joint Personnel
Directorate of Joint Intelligence
Directorate of Joint Operations
Directorate of Joint Logistics
Directorate of Joint Civil Affairs
Directorate of Joint Communications
Office of the Comptroller General

Operations Group
Armed Forces Development Command
Armed Forces Security Center
Counter Terrorist Operations Center

Special Services Group
Adjutant General's Department
Finance Department
Royal Thai Survey Department
Support Service Department
Military Information Technology Department
Department of Border Affairs

Education Group
National Defence Studies Institute
Armed Forces Education Department
Armed Forces Academies Preparatory School

Commanders

Chiefs of Defence Forces
The "Chief of Defence Forces" ( and the Deputy Chiefs of Defence Forces ( are responsible for the command and execution of military operations of the armed forces of Thailand.

See also
List of Chiefs of Defence Forces (Thailand)

References

External links
RTARF HQ website 

Military of Thailand
Thailand
Ministry of Defence (Thailand)